River Oaks District is an outdoor shopping complex of global luxury brands in  Houston, Texas, comprising 252,000 square feet of retail space with boutique styled shops, restaurants, sidewalk cafes, and an iPic movie theater among an expanding list of tenants.  Additionally, there is 92,000 square feet of office space and two 5-story buildings with 279 residential apartments called Grey House, in the 650,000 square foot mixed-use development. River Oaks District was developed and is managed by commercial real estate firm OliverMcMillan, LLC. The design team included architectural firms Gensler, Pappageorge Haymes, the landscape architecture firm of Hoerr Schaudt, and engineering firm of Walter P Moore. Instead of a large anchor store, the developers opted for multiple smaller, high-end anchors.

The upscale shopping destination officially welcomed its first shoppers on October 1, 2015, with a public grand opening celebration attended by developers, city officials and invited guests.

The complex layout is designed for strolling with heavily landscaped walkways, tree-lined streets, and curbside and garage parking. Restaurants and cafes are distributed throughout.

As of 2021, it includes many stores whose presence is only located at the exclusive shopping center, they include:

 Christian Dior
 Dolce & Gabbana
 Etro
 Hermes
 Kiton
 THEORY
 VILEBREQUIN
 CANALI
 CARTIER
 HARRY WINSTON
 PATEK PHILIPPE
 VAN CLEEF & ARPELS
 JOHN LOBB
 DIPTYQUE
 JO MALONE
 NARS
 BACCARAT
 DAVIDOFF OF GENEVA
 OLIVER PEOPLES
 EQUINOX
 MONCLER
 INTERMIX

References

External links
 River Oaks District

Shopping malls in Houston
Shopping malls established in 2015